Darrell Spencer (born 1947) is an American novelist and short story writer. He is best known for his short stories, which are widely published in literary journals and have been the recipients of several awards.

Life
He received his Ph.D. from the University of Utah.

Spencer recently retired from teaching literature and creative writing at Ohio University. He has been praised by Michael Chabon for "[possessing] a remarkable ear for the cadence of everyday speech," and by the New York Times Book Review for his "writing [which] crackles with freshness and lucidity, featuring characters who slide into one another in random encounters and relationships."

He currently teaches creative writing at Southern Utah University.

Awards
 Drue Heinz Literature Prize
 2010 Nevada Writers Hall of Fame
 2000 Flannery O'Connor Award for Short Fiction.

Bibliography 
 A Woman Packing a Pistol (1987), a collection of short stories. 
 Our Secret's Out (1993), a collection of short stories. 
 Caution: Men in Trees (2002), a collection of short stories. 
 Bring Your Legs with You (2004), interconnected short stories. 
 One Mile Past Dangerous Curve (2005), a novel.

References 

1947 births
American Latter Day Saint writers
University of Utah alumni
Ohio University faculty
21st-century American novelists
American male novelists
Living people
American male short story writers
21st-century American short story writers
21st-century American male writers
Novelists from Ohio
21st-century American non-fiction writers
American male non-fiction writers